The Federal Government College, Enugu (FGCE), popularly known as Fedi, is a secondary or high school in Enugu, Enugu State, Nigeria.  The school was created by the Nigerian government in 1973 as one of the federally funded "Unity schools" to bring together students from regions across Nigeria.  The school has facilities for both boarding and day students.  Students range from Junior Secondary One (JS1) through Senior Secondary Three (SS3).  Students must complete the Federal Common Entrance Exams in order to apply for attendance. There are approximately 3,000 students in attendance.

The school is situated on a large campus in Independence Layout, an upscale residential area in the heart of Enugu, the capital city of Enugu State.

Notable alumni

The secondary school's alumni include, former governors of Kaduna State and Cross River State, Bennet Ifeakandu Omalu, a Nigerian-American physician, forensic pathologist, and neuropathologist who was the first to discover and publish findings on chronic traumatic encephalopathy (CTE) in American football players while working at the Allegheny County Coroner's Office in Pittsburgh, ministers, and captains of industry. 
Otunba Akin Alabi
Buchi Atuonwu
Daniel K Daniel
Liyel Imoke
Ahmed Makarfi
Kingsley Moghalu
Bennet Omalu
Ndidi Okonkwo Nwuneli
Odunze Emeruem
Benedict Peters
Chukwuemeka Ujam
Emmanuel Ukaegbu
Chikwe Ihekweazu
Adaeze Joseph-Yobo
Ernest Umeike

See also
 Federal Government College

References

Secondary schools in Enugu State
Educational institutions established in 1973
1973 establishments in Nigeria
Government schools in Nigeria